Underwater Warrior is a 1958 CinemaScope film telling the story of the US Navy's Underwater Demolition Teams between World War II and the Korean War.  It was based on the 1957 nonfiction book The Naked Warriors by Commander Francis Douglas Fane. Dan Dailey played Fane with two naval officer divers also appearing in the film, Lt Alex Fane, Francis's son and Lt Jon Lindbergh, son of Charles Lindbergh. Producer Ivan Tors subsequently produced the syndicated television series Sea Hunt, also on underwater diving themes.

Cast
 Dan Dailey as Cmdr. David Forest
 James Gregory as Lt. William Arnold, MD
 Ross Martin as Sgt. Joe O'Brien
 Raymond Bailey as Adm. Ashton
 Alex Gerry as Captain of Battleship
 Claire Kelly as Anne Winnmore

Reception
According to MGM records the film earned $405,000 in the US and Canada and $390,000 elsewhere, making a profit of $34,000.

See also
 List of American films of 1958

References

External links

Underwater Warrior at TCMDB

1958 films
1958 drama films
American black-and-white films
American war drama films
CinemaScope films
1950s English-language films
Films directed by Andrew Marton
Films about the United States Navy in World War II
Films based on non-fiction books
Films scored by Harry Sukman
Korean War films
Metro-Goldwyn-Mayer films
Underwater action films
1950s American films